Twitchell Lake is located northeast of Big Moose, New York. The outlet is Twitchell Creek which flows into Stillwater Reservoir. Fish species present in the lake are brook trout, yellow perch, and black bullhead. There is a state owned beach launch located on Twitchell Road. There is not a horsepower motor limit on Twitchell Lake. Twitchell Mountain is located northwest of Twitchell 
Lake.

A webpage for the lake is located at http://www.twitchelllake.com

References 

Lakes of Herkimer County, New York